American singer Nicky Jam has released six studio albums, three compilation albums, one EP, one Mixtape, and 30 singles as a lead artist.

Albums

Studio albums

Compilation albums

EP

Mixtapes

Singles

Other songs

1995
"Brinquen"

1996
"Cuerpo De Campeona"
"Muchos Pensaron Que The Cream Se Acabo"

1997
"Casanova"

1998
"El Desorden"
"Unos Tripean"
"Mi Gente Tiene Que Bailar"
"Yo Tengo Algo"
"Descontrol"

1999
"Tienen El Control"

2000
"Pelean Por Fama"
"Y Las Gatas"
"Para La Chica" (featuring Big Boy)

2001–present
"Gata Salvaje" (featuring Daddy Yankee, Héctor & Tito)
"La Gata" (featuring Daddy Yankee)
"Tu Cuerpo En La Cama" (featuring Daddy Yankee)
"La Conspiracion" (featuring Daddy Yankee, Falo)
"Guayando" (featuring Daddy Yankee)
"Como Te Llamas"
"Te Quiero Tocar"
"Sabanas Blancas" (featuring Daddy Yankee)
"Me Voy Pa'l Party"
"Musika Killa" (featuring Daddy Yankee)
"Ya No Queda Nada" (featuring Tito Nieves, La India and K-Mil)
"Chambonea"
"Loco"
"Vive Contigo"
"Tus Ojos"
"Pasado" (featuring R.K.M & Ken-Y)
"Dale"
"Tú Tienes Que Ser Mía"
"Ton Ton Ton" (featuring R.K.M & Ken-Y)
"Dime Si Piensas En Mí"
"I Love You"
"Noche De Accion"
"Amor de Dos" (with Karol G)
"Piensas En Mi"
"Piensas En Mi Remix" (featuring Jory, Lui-G 21+)
"Olvidarte No Quiero" (featuring Magnate & Valentino, Alberto Stylee)
"Eres Tu" 
"Curiosidad"
"Juegos Prohibidos"
"El Party Me Llama" (Daddy Yankee)
"Tu Primera Vez"
"Voy A Beber"
"Voy A Beber Remix" (featuring Ñejo)
"Voy A Beber Remix 2" (featuring Ñejo, Farruko, Cosculluela)
"Los Perros Se Enamoran" (Andy Rivera)
"Una Noche Mas" (Kevin Roldan)
"Suele Suceder" (Piso 21)
"Sigo Aqui"
"Adicta"
"La Calle Lo Pidió Remix" (Cosculluela, Tito El Bambino, Wisin, Zion and J Alvarez)
"Travesuras Remix" (featuring De La Ghetto, Arcángel, Zion, J Balvin)
"Contesté Remix" (El Sica)
"Adiós" (Mambo Remix) (with Ricky Martin)
"Adicta A Tu Redes" (Tito El Bambino)
"Fanatica Sensual RMX" (Plan B (duo))
"Un Sueno" 
"Te Busco"  (featuring Cosculluela)
"Materialista" (featuring Silvestre Dangond)
"Sunset" (Farruko)
"Estas Aqui"  (DJ Nelson)
"Pensandote" (Arcángel)
"Nadie Como Tu" (featuring El Alfa)
"Cheap Thrills Remix" (Sia)
"De Pies A Cabeza" (Maná)
"Perro Fiel" (Shakira)
"Te Boté (Remix)" 
"Icon (Remix)"
"Dancarina" as featuring

Album appearances

The Cream Vol. 1
The Cream Vol. 2
The Cream Egyptian Live
The Cream Hits
DJ Chilin': Los Más Buscado (1996)
Wise Da' Gangsta: La Vieja Escuela Vol. 1 (1997)
Benny Blanco: Tierra De Nadie (1997)
Gargolas 1: El Comando Ataca (1998)
Playero 41 (1998)
Dream Team: La Union De Los Mejores (1999)
Gargolas 2: El Nuevo Comando (1999) 
Guatauba 2000 (2000)
La Misión 1 (2000)
Virus (Big Boy) (2000)
DJ Blass: Sandunguero (2001)
El Cartel II (2001)
La Conspiracion (2001)
Mundo Frío (2001)
A La Reconquista (2002)
Gargolas 3 (2002)
Barbosa Live: Los Exitos (2002)
DJ Blass: Sandunguero 2 (2002)
DJ Dicky: No Fear 4 – Sin Miedo (2002)
El Cangri.com (2002)
Los Dueños De La Disco (2002)
Playero 42 (2002)
Rompiendo El Hielo (2002)
Tha Bulbas (2002)
Vida Eterna (2002)
Blin Blin Vol. 1 (2003)
D'Untouchables Chapter 1 (2003)
La Coleccion (2003)
La Conspiracion 2: La Secuela (2003)
Los Homerun-es (2003)
Los Matadores Del Genero (2003)
Pina All-Star (2003)
Romances Del Ruido 2 (2003)
Chosen Few: El Documental (2004)
Fuera de Serie (2004)
La Mision 4: The Take Over (2004)
La Trayectoria (2004)
12 Discípulos (2004)
Pina All-Star 2 (2004)
Rebuleando Con Estilo (2004)
Sabotage (2004)
The Noise, Vol. 10: The Last Noise (2004)
Da' Concert of Reggaeton (2005)
40 Entre Las 2 (2005)
Da Cream (2005)
DJ Blass and DJ Barbosa Presentan: Reggaeton Remix (2005)
DJ Blass: Sandunguero Hits (2005)
Guatauba: Guatagatos (2005)
Fuera De Serie Live (2005)
Los Bandoleros (2005)
Los Kambumbos: Tierra De Nadie (2005)
Reggaeton Bachatero Non Stop (2005)
Reggaeton's Best Features (2005)
Romances Del Ruido Collection (2005)
The Prezident (2005)
DJ Raymond Presents: The Roots of Reggaeton (2006)
Gargolas: Next Generation (2006)
Los Titerones (2006)
Reggaeton Hits (2006)
Masterpiece (2006)
Gargolas: Reborn (2007)
Los Titeres (2007)
Masterpiece: Commemorative Edition (2007)
Los 4 Fantasticos (2007)
Marroneo Con Flow (2008)
Los Brothers  (2008)
Los Mackieavelikos (2008)
Manada Records Presenta : The President Mixtape (2012)
Prestige (2012)
Orion (2015)

Notes

References

Reggaeton discographies
Discographies of American artists